New York City's  Central Park is the home of many works of public art in various media, such as bronze, stone and tile. Many are sculptures in the form of busts, statues, equestrian statues, and panels carved or cast in low relief. Others are two-dimensional bronze or tile plaques. Some artworks do double-duty as fountains, or as part of fountains; some serve as memorials dedicated to a cause, to notable individuals, and in one case, to a notable animal. Most were donated by individuals or civic organizations; only a few were funded by the city.

Examples of public art in the park include memorials dedicated to notable individuals such as the poet William Shakespeare and the statesman Daniel Webster; depictions of archetypical characters such as The Pilgrim, Indian Hunter, and The Falconer; depictions of literary characters such as Alice in Wonderland; numerous depictions of imaginary animals, and at least one of a real one (the statue of Balto). There is one artifact from the ancient world—the Egyptian obelisk known as "Cleopatra's Needle", probably the oldest and largest artwork in the park.

Until recently, depictions of real (as opposed to imaginary) humans have been men, whereas depictions of women have been either mythological characters (angels or goddesses) or characters from literature. The installation in 2020 of the Women's Rights Pioneers Monument, depicting three female activists, was a first step in addressing this oversight.

Public art in the park has from the beginning been representational in character; the abstract idiom has rarely, if ever, been employed. 

In recent years, park administrators have provided a forum for temporary exhibitions of artwork at the Doris Freedman Plaza, a concrete and cobblestone area located just outside the southeast entrance to the park, behind the Sherman Monument.

List of public art in Central Park

A - D

E - K

L - R

S - Z

Public art in Central Park now removed

Temporary installations of public art

Notes

References

External links

 O Ryan's Roughnecks – History of the 7th Regiment, National Guard New York
 The Central Park Conservancy
 NYC Dept. of Parks & Recreation – Eagles and Prey statue
 Outdoor Monuments of Manhattan: A Historical Guide Essays on the Sherman Monument, Simón Bolívar, José Martí, Maine Monument, Columbus Monument, Columbus by Sunol, Shakespeare, Richard Morris Hunt Memorial, King Jagiello, Alexander Hamilton
 ALICE IN CENTRAL PARK — STATUES IN WONDERLAND by G.A. Mudge, visual reference of the statues in central park, with historical comments.

 
Central Park
Central Park
Manhattan-related lists
Central Park